The Ripaults Factory is a grade II listed art deco factory building in Southbury Road, in the London Borough of Enfield.

History
The factory was constructed around 1930 or 1936 to a design by A.H. Durnford for the Ripaults firm who made automotive electrical cables and components. The firm were still located there in 1973. The building was later used by truck makers MAN and in 2015 was taken over by builder's merchants Travis Perkins.

References

External links 

Photograph of the building

Enfield, London
Grade II listed buildings in the London Borough of Enfield
Industrial buildings in the United Kingdom
Buildings and structures completed in 1930
1930 in London